All ground ambulance, medical communications, air ambulance service in Nova Scotia, Canada, is contracted by EHS to Emergency Medical Care Inc. (EMC), a subsidiary of Medavie Health Services.

History
Emergency Medical Care Inc. (EMC) has been a service provider since the inception of the province-wide system in 1998, which involved the amalgamation of 59 separate service providers across Nova Scotia to create a province-wide and integrated system.

Activities
The Extended Care Program: The main goal of an ECP is to respond to non-emergency calls in nursing homes where they will assess and potentially treat patients on site. This will reduce the need for some patients to go to hospital via ambulance and wait in the emergency department for several hours, thus creating a more personal approach to health care by allowing patients and their families to remain in a comfortable environment for as long as possible.

The Clinical Support Desk: Historically, a high volume of calls to EHS are non-emergency and as such, automatically dispatching an ambulance may not best address patient needs nor is it the best use of resources. However, the current system is not set up to provide alternate levels of care or transport. A first of its kind in Canada, a Clinical Support Desk (CSD) will handle these low-acuity calls. Paramedics and nurses, with active clinical experience, are recruited, trained and in place at the CSD to make clinical decisions in offering alternative pathways to non-emergency care, conducting follow up calls to high-risk patients not transported and providing clinical support to field staff. The role of the CSD will always be developing and supported by the EHS Provincial Medical Director.

Support services
Peer & Family Support Services
Operation Safety Coach
Joint Occupational Health & Safety Committee (JOHSC)
EHS Research Committee
Emergency Preparedness & Special Operations Team
Health & Wellness Program

References

External links
 EMC Inc.

Ambulance services in Canada
Companies based in Halifax, Nova Scotia
Companies established in 1998
1998 establishments in Nova Scotia